Pardomima testudinalis is a moth of the family Crambidae. It is found in Madagascar.

This species has a wingspan of approx. 24 mm with triangular forewings.

References

Moths described in 1880
Spilomelinae
Moths of Madagascar
Moths of Africa